Anaeromusa is a Gram-negative and obligately anaerobic bacterial genus from the family of Sporomusaceae, with one known species (Anaeromusa acidaminophila).

References

Further reading 
 
 

Negativicutes
Monotypic bacteria genera
Bacteria genera